Yangum is a Torricelli dialect cluster of Papua New Guinea. Gel is nearly extinct. The principal variety is Mon, which is also known as Aiku, Malek, Menandon ~ Minendon; these names have been used for all Yangum varieties plus the closely related Ambrak.

External links 
 Paradisec's open access collection of Selected Research Papers of Don Laycock on Languages in Papua New Guinea (DL2) includes materials on the Yangum language

References

Palei languages
Languages of Sandaun Province